William Dawes was a 19th century abolitionist who worked at Oberlin College.

Life 
Dawes and John Keep toured England in 1839 and 1840 gathering funds for Oberlin College in Ohio. They both attended the 1840 anti-slavery convention in London.

John Keep and William Dawes both undertook a fund raising mission in England in 1839 and 1840 to raise funds from sympathetic abolitionists. Oberlin College was one of the few mult-racial and co-educational colleges in America at that time.

Both John Keep and Dawes are credited with helping to start the collection of African Americana at Oberlin College which inspired other writers.

A house occupied by someone of the same name was in Hudson, Ohio in the 1830s supporting the route for escaping slaves.

References

American abolitionists
People from Oberlin, Ohio
Oberlin College faculty
Year of death missing
Year of birth missing
Activists from Ohio